"Talkin' to the Moon" is a song written by Larry Gatlin, and recorded by American country music group Larry Gatlin & the Gatlin Brothers.  It was released in November 1986 as the second single from their album Partners.  The song peaked at number 4 on the Billboard Hot Country Singles chart.

Chart performance

References

1986 singles
1986 songs
Larry Gatlin songs
Columbia Records singles
Songs written by Larry Gatlin